A  is a district where geisha live and work in Japan.

Gion, a geisha district in Kyoto, also has a vocational school, called . Many of the teachers there are designated as Living National Treasures.

, technically the highest rank of courtesan, also lived in the red-light districts; however, unlike , they did not engage in sex work, and were instead renowned as upper-class entertainers prized for their training in the traditional arts, which typically began at an early age.  were only engaged by men of the upper classes, and could choose which clients they wished to engage, unlike other courtesans.

All three  are now defunct, both as courtesan districts and geisha districts, though  reenactors continue to practice the performing arts of upper-class courtesans in Shimabara, Kyoto, and some conventional sex work establishments continue to exist in Yoshiwara, Tokyo.

Kyoto 

 Gion (separated as Gion Kōbu and Gion Higashi)
 Miyagawa-chō
 Kamishichiken
 Pontochō

The geisha districts of Kyoto are primarily clustered around the Kamo River, from Sanjō Street (3rd Street) to Gojō Street (5th Street), particularly around Shijō Street – four of the five districts are in this area.

Traditions

Each district has a distinctive crest ( or ), which appears on geisha's kimono, as well as on lanterns.

These feature a crest of the geisha house on the front, and the geisha's name on the back (house name, then personal name). Establishments such as bars that are particularly frequented by geisha often accumulate many of these fans, and typically display them in the summer months.

These also feature an optional tea ceremony (tea and  served by ) before the performance. These are performed for several weeks, mostly in the spring – four  hold them in the spring with one (Gion Higashi) holding theirs in the autumn. Different districts started public performances in different years; the oldest are those of Gion Kōbu and Pontochō, whose performances started at the Kyoto exhibition of 1872, while others (Kamishichiken, Miyagawachō) started performing in the 1950s. There are many performances, with tickets being inexpensive, ranging from around 1500 yen to 4500 yen. The best-known is the  performed in Gion Kōbu, which is one of the two oldest and has the most performances.

The dances are as follows (listed in order of performance through the year):
  – Kamishichiken (since 1953), spring, varying dates, currently last week of March and first week of April
  – Gion Kōbu (since 1872), all of April
  – Miyagawa-chō (since the 1950s), first 2 weeks of April
  – Pontochō (since 1872), most of May
  – Gion Higashi, early November

There is also a combined show of all five districts, which is called , or more formally . This takes place during the daytime on two days (Saturday and Sunday) on a weekend in late June (typically last or second-to-last weekend) at a large venue, and tickets are significantly more expensive than those for individual districts. Connected with this event, in the evening on these two days there are evening performances with  meals, either a combined event, or separate ones per district.

Tokyo 
 Shinbashi
 Akasaka
 Asakusa
 Yoshichō
 Kagurazaka
 Mukojima
 Omori Kaigan

near Tokyo
 Hachiōji

Areas historically renowned as 
 Torimori
 Shintomichō
 Fukagawa
 Maruyamachō
 Yanagibashi
 Nakano Shinbashi

In Osaka
 Kita Shinchi
 Minami Shinchi
 Shinmachi

In Kanazawa
Kanazawa's geisha districts were most active between the periods of 1820–1830 and 1867–1954.
 Higashi Chaya Gai (eastern teahouse district)
 Nishi Chaya Gai (western teahouse district)
 Kazuemachi (the accountant's town)

References

External links

Geisha
Japanese words and phrases